Urbain Comitis (born 1900, date of death unknown) was a French racing cyclist. He rode in the 1925 Tour de France.

References

1900 births
Year of death missing
French male cyclists
Place of birth missing